Tristram the Younger, son of Tristram was the fourth and last king of Lyonesse according to the very late Italian romance I Due Tristani. He was drowned when Lyonesse sank beneath the waves, shortly after the Battle of Camlann in 537. Following the battle, King Arthur's men fled west across Lyonesse, pursued by Mordred and his men. Arthur's men survived by reaching what are now the Isles of Scilly, but Mordred's men perished in the inundation.

Arthurian characters